Singsås Station is a railway station located in the village of Singsås in the municipality of Midtre Gauldal in Trøndelag county, Norway.  It is located along the Rørosbanen railway line. The station is served three times daily in each direction by the Trøndelag Commuter Rail service between Røros and Trondheim. The service is operated by SJ Norge.

History
The station was opened in 1876, one year before the Rørosbanen railway line was completed.

References

Midtre Gauldal
Railway stations in Trøndelag
Railway stations on the Røros Line
Railway stations opened in 1876
1876 establishments in Norway